"Lonely Nights" is a song by Mickey Gilley.

Lonely Nights may also refer to:

Songs 
 "Lonely Nights", by Bryan Adams from the album You Want It You Got It
 "Lonely Nights", by Scorpions from the album Face the Heat
 "Lonely Nights", by White Lion from the album Pride
 "Lonely Nights", by The Kentucky Headhunters from the album Soul

See also 
 Lonely Night (disambiguation)
 Lonely Is the Night (disambiguation)